Ireland returned at the 1998 Winter Olympics in Nagano, Japan after they missed the 1994 Winter Olympics.

Alpine skiing

Men

Men's combined

Bobsleigh

References
Official Olympic Reports
 Olympic Winter Games 1998, full results by sports-reference.com

Nations at the 1998 Winter Olympics
1998
1998 in Irish sport